Don Carlos of Spain or Infante Carlos of Spain may refer to:

 Charles V, Holy Roman Emperor (1500–1558), also known as Carlos I of Spain, maternal grandson of the Catholic Monarchs King Ferdinand II of Aragon and Queen Isabella of Castile.
 Don Carlos, Prince of Asturias (1545–1568), eldest son of Philip II of Spain and therefore grandson of the above-mentioned Charles V, Holy Roman Emperor
 Don Carlos, Infante of Spain (1607–1632), second surviving son of Philip III of Spain
 Baltasar Carlos, Prince of Asturias (1629–1646), eldest son of Philip IV of Spain
 Charles II of Spain (1661–1700), last Habsburg King of Spain as Carlos II
 Infante Carlos, Count of Molina (1788–1855), pretender as Carlos V (the first claimant king of Spanish Carlism) and second surviving son of Charles IV of Spain
 Carlos, Count of Montemolin (1818–1861), Carlist pretender as Carlos VI
 Carlos, Duke of Madrid (1848–1909), Carlist pretender as Carlos VII
 Alfonso Carlos, Duke of San Jaime (1849–1936), Carlist pretender as Alfonso Carlos I
 Archduke Karl Pius, Prince of Tuscany (1909–1953), leader of breakaway Carlist movement between 1943 and 1953 and a disputed pretender as Carlos VIII
 Carlos Hugo, Duke of Parma (1930–2010), former Carlist Prince of Asturias and pretender to the throne of Spain under the name Carlos VIII

See also
 Don Carlos (disambiguation)